Penance is a 2009 American horror film directed by Jake Kennedy. It stars Jason Connery, Marieh Delfino, Graham McTavish, and Michael Rooker. Horror film icon Tony Todd has a cameo role as a sinister chauffeur.

Premise
A young mother decides to become a stripper to earn some fast cash only to find her worst nightmares are about to begin when she falls into the hands of a religious fanatic intent on changing her "evil" ways.

Cast

Release
On November 17, 2009; an unrated Director's Cut was released on DVD by Independent Media Distribution. It was later released by Allegro Corporation on October 22, 2013.

References

External links
 
 
 

2009 films
2009 horror films
American horror films
Religious horror films
2000s English-language films
2000s American films
English-language horror films